The "Chute na santa" incident was a religious controversy that erupted in Brazil in late 1995, sparked by a live broadcast of a minister of Universal Church of the Kingdom of God (UCKG), the largest pentecostal church in Brazil, kicking the statue of Our Lady of Aparecida, a Roman Catholic saint.

The incident
The incident took place on October 12, 1995, the national public holiday honouring Our Lady of Aparecida, the patron saint of Brazil. That dawn, on O Despertar da Fé, a national live television program by UCKG broadcast on Rede Record (owned by the same church), televangelist bishop Sérgio Von Helder was expressing his thoughts about his church's biblical teachings on "imagery" and "idolatry" on the saint's day, when an actual icon of the saint was shown. Then, as he walked around the image, talking about its inability "to see" and "to hear", he started to kick the image, proclaiming its "inability to react, because it's made of clay". 

On the following day, Rede Globo's Jornal Nacional denounced the incident, causing a nationwide commotion. The event was perceived by Catholics as a major act of religious intolerance, sparking a public outcry. Several temples of the UCKG were the target of protests, and Von Helder had to be transferred to South Africa until the end of the controversy.

Network rivalry
Some see the incident as another clash between Rede Record and Rede Globo. A few months prior to the incident, Globo had broadcast a mini-series by Dias Gomes titled Decadência, which depicted the fictional tale of Mariel Batista (Edson Celulari), a corrupt Protestant pastor. According to a Rede Record documentary about the imprisonment of Edir Macedo (UCKG founder and Record owner), some lines of the character were based on public speeches by him.

Reaction
Pope John Paul II urged Catholics not to "answer evil with evil". Dom Eugênio de Araújo Sales, then Archbishop of Rio de Janeiro, said that "unless we control our emotions, there is the risk of a holy war.

President of Brazil Fernando Henrique Cardoso, when questioned about the incident, said that "Brazil is a democratic country known by its tolerance" and that "any demonstration of intolerance hurts its unison spirit as well as its Christian spirit".

Cultural references
The "kicking of the saint" episode is referenced in the 1997 song Guerra Santa, written and performed by Gilberto Gil. In this song, featured in the album Quanta, Gil criticizes prosperity theology, one of the tenets of UCKG and other popular Neopentecostal churches in Brazil.

See also 

 Anti-Catholicism
 History of Roman Catholicism in Brazil
 Persecution of Christians
 Roman Catholicism in Brazil

References

1995 in Brazil
1995 in Brazilian television
Anti-Catholicism
Protestantism-related controversies
Universal Church of the Kingdom of God